Elections to the eleventh Supreme Soviet were held in the Soviet Union on 4 March 1984. They were the last in the Soviet Union to be held before Mikhail Gorbachev's policies of perestroika and demokratizatsiya resulted in partially free elections in 1989. They were also the last direct elections to the Supreme Soviet, as in 1989 deputies were elected to the Congress of People's Deputies, who then elected the Supreme Soviet.

Electoral system
Candidates had to be nominated by the Communist Party of the Soviet Union (CPSU) or by a public organisation. However, all public organisations were controlled by the party and were subservient to a 1931 law that required them to accept party rule. The CPSU itself remained the only legal one in the country.

Voters could vote against the CPSU candidate, but could only do so by using polling booths, whereas votes for the party could be cast simply by submitting a blank ballot. Turnout was required to be over 50% for the election to be valid.

Candidates
CPSU candidates accounted for around three quarters of the nominees, whilst many of the others were members of Komsomol.

Results
With over 184 million Soviet citizens voting in the election, over 99% of the votes went to a deputy to the Supreme Soviet, with over 100,000 votes against Party candidates, the lowest for any election in the Soviet Union.

Soviet of the Union

Soviet of Nationalities

References

Soviet Union
Soviet Union
Legislative elections in the Soviet Union
One-party elections
Single-candidate elections
Soviet Union